The following are the national records in athletics in Russia maintained by All-Russia Athletic Federation (ARAF).

Outdoor

Key to tables:

+ = en route to a longer distance

h = hand timing

# = not recognised by World Athletics

X = unratified due to no doping control or doping violation

Men

Women

Indoor

Men

Women

See also
List of Soviet records in athletics

Notes

References

External links
ARAF web site
Russian Outdoor Records 

Russia
Records
Athletics
Athletics